Eagle Heights is an elevated area located south of Koksilah Ridge on Vancouver Island, British Columbia, Canada. Populated areas where it is visible include North Saanich, Sidney, and Shawnigan Lake.

Its bedrock lithology is dominated by Upper Triassic period basalt at and around the summit. This formation is bordered on the west by Jurassic period volcanics which are of more variable composition. To the north, east and south is a complex of Pennsylvanian age argillite, chert, diabase and greywacke.

Most soils on Eagle Heights are shallow, stony gravelly sandy loams with podzol profile development. The forests they support belong to the Coastal Western Hemlock zone with Douglas-fir, western hemlock and western red cedar as the most common trees. In May 2018 some lower elevations supporting old-growth  Douglas-fir and numerous rare plant species were given protected status, possibly to be incorporated with Koksilah River Provincial Park.

Loggers have harvested Eagle Heights over the years, leaving clear-cut areas which are most eye-catching when a snow cover is present. A particularly large clear area was present around the summit in the 1970s. This has since regenerated to native coniferous forest. In recent years the Heights were logged less heavily than neighbouring hills until new logging activity by Island Timberlands began on mid-elevations of the eastern slope in 2011. Mountain bike trails are also active and at least one of them leads to the summit.

References

Muller, J.E. (1980). Geology Victoria Map 1553A. Ottawa: Geological Survey of Canada.
Jungen, J.R. (1985). Soils of Southern Vancouver Island. Victoria: Ministry of Environment Technical Report 17.
Management Plan Koksilah River Provincial Park

 

Southern Vancouver Island
Plateaus of British Columbia
Geography of Vancouver Island
Volcanism of British Columbia
Triassic volcanism
Jurassic volcanism